(or), sometimes anglicized as bocce ball, bocci or boccie, is a ball sport belonging to the boules family. Developed into its present form in Italy, it is closely related to British bowls and French , with a common ancestry from ancient games played in the Roman Empire. Bocce is played around western, southern and southeastern Europe, as well as in overseas areas with historical Italian immigrant population, including Australia, North America, and South America, principally Argentina and the southern Brazilian state of Rio Grande do Sul. Initially played just by the Italian immigrants, the game has slowly become more popular with their descendants and more broadly.

History

Having developed from games played in the Roman Empire, Bocce developed into its present form in Italy, where it is called , the plural of the Italian word  which means 'bowl' in the general sporting sense, it spread around Europe and also in regions to which Italians have migrated. First form of regulation was described in the book "Gioco delle bocchie" by Raffaele Bisteghi in 1753. The accessibility of bocce to people of all ages and abilities has seen it grow in popularity among Special Olympics programmes globally and it is now the third most played sport among Special Olympics athletes.

Geographical spread

There are numerous bocce leagues in the United States. Most have been founded by Italian Americans but contain members of all groups.

Rules and play

While the court walls are traditionally made of wood or stone, many social leagues and Special Olympics programs now use inflatable 'Packabocce' PVC courts due to their portability and ease of storage. Bocce balls can be made of wood (traditional), metal, baked clay, or various kinds of plastic. Unlike lawn bowls, bocce balls are spherical and have no inbuilt bias.
  
A game can be conducted between two players, or two teams of two, three, or four. If the first team misses twice, the other team is awarded the opportunity to place the jack anywhere they choose within the prescribed zone. Casual play is common in reasonably flat areas of parks and yards lacking a Bocce court, but players should agree to the minimum and maximum distance the jack may be thrown before play begins.

The side that first attempted to place the jack is given the opportunity to bowl first. Once the first bowl has taken place, the other side has the opportunity to bowl. From then on, the side which does not have the ball closest to the jack has a chance to bowl, up until one side or the other has used their four balls. At that point, the other side bowls its remaining balls. The object of the game is for a team to get as many of its balls as possible closer to the target ball (jack, boccino, pallino) than the opposing team.  The team with the closest ball to the jack is the only team that can score points in any frame. The scoring team receives one point for each of their balls that is closer to the jack than the closest ball of the other team. The length of a game varies by region but is typically from 7 to 13 points.

Players are permitted to throw the ball in the air using an underarm action. This is generally used to knock either the jack or another ball away to attain a more favorable position. Tactics can get quite complex when players have sufficient control over the ball to throw or roll it accurately.

Variants

Bocce volo

A variation called  uses a metal ball, which is thrown overhand (palm down), after a run-up to the throwing line. Another French variant of the game is called , and (lacking the run-up) is more similar in some respects to traditional .

Boccia

Another development, for persons with disabilities, is called . It is a shorter-range game, played with leather balls on an indoor, smooth surface. Boccia was first introduced to the Paralympics at the 1984 New York/Stoke Mandeville Summer Games, and is one of the only two Paralympic sports that do not have an Olympic counterpart (the other being goalball).

See also

Fédération Internationale de Boules

References

External links

 Confederation Mondiale des Sports de Boules
 International Bocce Federation (FIB)

Boules
Lawn games
Sports originating in Italy
Articles containing video clips